C'est beau la vie quand on y pense is a 2017 French film directed by Gérard Jugnot.

Plot
Loïc Le Tallec, a former rally driver, who had a minor hit in the 1980s now in his sixties, vegetate as a salesman in a car dealership. When his teenage son suddenly disappears behind the wheel of his car, Loïc is devastated by this tragedy. He also learns that his son has donated his heart, and goes in search of the one who received this gift, which will prove to be an explosive encounter for Loïc.

Cast
 Gérard Jugnot as Loïc Le Tallec
 François Deblock as Hugo
 Isabelle Mergault as Lisa
 Bernard Le Coq as Marc
 Gaia Weiss as Hoëllig
 Hubert Saint-Macary as Pierre
 Marie Bunel as Clara
 Jérémy Lopez as Sanchez
 Giulia Rossa
 Camille Vidacek

Production
The filming began on 29 September 2016. in Île-de-France, Var and Brittany.

References

External links
 

Films shot in France
2017 films
2010s French-language films
French comedy-drama films
Films directed by Gérard Jugnot
2010s French films